Strabane Township is a township in Grand Forks County, in the U.S. state of North Dakota.

History
The township was perhaps named after Strabane, in Northern Ireland.

References

Townships in Grand Forks County, North Dakota
Townships in North Dakota